A karvalakki is a cylinder-shaped, furry forage cap-styled hat typically worn in parts of Finland and Russia. Finnish TV presenter Hannu Karpo often wore a karvalakki on his show, Karpolla on asiaa.

In Finnish, the expression karvalakkimalli ("furry cap model") means a bare-bones, no-frills model, meaning the cheapest and most basic model that just works and does nothing extra. The term can also be used to describe anything that is very basic.

See also
 Ushanka
 Papakhi

Finnish clothing
Hats